Holcocera chalcofrontella is a moth in the  family Blastobasidae. It is found in North America, including Pennsylvania, Texas, Missouri, Maryland, West Virginia, Arizona, British Columbia, Florida, Illinois, Maine, Manitoba, Michigan, New Brunswick, Ohio, Ontario, Quebec, Tennessee, Vermont and Washington.

Larvae have been reared on the seeds of Rhus species, as well as the burrs of chestnuts.

References

Moths described in 1863
chalcofrontella